The ASI has recognized 264 Monuments of National Importance in Agra circle of Uttar Pradesh.  For technical reasons the Agra circle has to be split in two lists. The rest of Agra circle can be found in the list of Agra circle, except Agra district.

List of monuments 

|}

See also 
 List of Monuments of National Importance in Patna circle in Uttar Pradesh
 List of Monuments of National Importance in Lalitpur district
 List of Monuments of National Importance in Lucknow circle/North
 List of Monuments of National Importance in Lucknow circle/South
 List of Monuments of National Importance in India for other Monuments of National Importance in India
 List of State Protected Monuments in Uttar Pradesh

References

Monuments of National Importance
Uttar Pradesh, Agra district
Tourist attractions in Agra district